"Stay With Me" is a song recorded by James Brown. Released as a single in 1981, it charted #80 R&B. It also appeared on the album Soul Syndrome.

References

James Brown songs
Songs written by Bobby Byrd
1981 singles
1981 songs